Clifford Ross Powell (July 26, 1893March 28, 1973) was an American, who served as the acting governor of New Jersey from January 3, 1935, to January 8, 1935.

Biography
He was born in Lumberton Township, New Jersey on July 26, 1893. He was educated at Mount Holly High School, studied law, and attained admission to the bar.  Powell practiced in Mount Holly, New Jersey, and served as an Assistant County Prosecutor for Burlington County, New Jersey and the city or town attorney for several Burlington County municipalities.

Powell enlisted in the New Jersey National Guard, and advanced to the rank of sergeant. He served in the United States Army during World War I, receiving a commission in the Aviation branch.  During the war he was wounded, credited with shooting down two German planes, and received the Croix de Guerre twice.  In 1941 he was promoted to Major General in the New Jersey National Guard as commander of the 44th Infantry Division.  Powell was relieved of his division command after maneuvers in North and South Carolina, and continued to serve in New Jersey until he retired from the military in 1948.

In 1922 he was elected to the New Jersey State Assembly.  He was Majority Leader in 1924, and served as Speaker in 1925.

He was a member of the New Jersey Senate from Burlington County, New Jersey from 1928 to 1939.  He served as acting governor for the last five days of his tenure as President of the New Jersey Senate, after A. Harry Moore resigned to take a seat in the United States Senate.  In his brief time as acting governor, he took the opportunity to abolish the New Jersey State Recovery Administration, the state-level counterpart of the National Recovery Administration, which had been establishing minimum prices and other "fair competition" codes.  He ran unsuccessfully for governor in 1937.

A resident of Lumberton Township, New Jersey, he died on March 28, 1973, at Burlington County Memorial Hospital.

References

External links
 Generals of World War II

1893 births
1973 deaths
Politicians from Burlington County, New Jersey
Republican Party governors of New Jersey
Speakers of the New Jersey General Assembly
Republican Party members of the New Jersey General Assembly
Republican Party New Jersey state senators
People from Lumberton Township, New Jersey
Presidents of the New Jersey Senate
20th-century American politicians
United States Army generals
United States Army personnel of World War I
United States Army generals of World War II
Military personnel from New Jersey